Thomas Savage (September 16, 1808 - November 21, 1887) was a merchant, shipowner and politician in the province of Quebec, Canada. He served in the Legislative Council of Quebec, the upper house of the Legislature of Quebec.

Savage was born on Jersey in the Channel Islands, the son of Jean Savage and Elizabeth Degnesley. Raised at Jersey, at some point he emigrated to Canada.

He became a merchant and ship owner at l'Anse-du-Cap, in the Gaspé region. He was a major in the local militia. On April 4, 1847, he married Julie Colin-Laliberté.

Savage stood for election to the Legislative Assembly of the Province of Canada in the general election of 1863 but was defeated. In 1873, he was appointed to the Legislative Council for the Gulf division, as a supporter of the Conservative party of Quebec. He held that position for nearly fourteen years until his resignation in February 1887.

Savage died at l'Anse-du-Cap in November, 1887.

External links 

 Quebec National Assembly, Québec Dictionary of Parliamentary Biography, from 1764 to the present: Thomas Savage

1808 births
1887 deaths
Conservative Party of Quebec MLCs
Jersey emigrants to Canada
British emigrants to pre-Confederation Quebec